"Love Is Dreaming" is MAX's 7th single released under Avex Trax. Both the title song and b-side were originally English songs written by Joey Carbone and Jeff Carruthers entitled, "First Kiss" and "Be Good To Me." They were recorded and released in Japan in 1991 by Singaporean singer, Maizurah. With the help of the original songwriters, a Japanese version of "First Kiss" was rewritten and recorded as "Love Is Dreaming" and "Be Good To Me" was rewritten as "Wonderland." The single debuted and peaked at #4.

Track listing

Charts 
Oricon Sales Chart (Japan)

References 

MAX (band) songs
1997 singles
Songs written by Joey Carbone
Song recordings produced by Max Matsuura
1997 songs
Avex Trax singles